Jonathan Edwin Peter Walford (born 24 January 1982) is an English cricketer.  Walford is a right-handed batsman who bowled right-arm medium.  He was born in Hornchurch in the London Borough of Havering.

Walford made his debut for Bedfordshire in the 2004 Minor Counties Championship against Staffordshire.  Walford played Minor counties cricket for Bedfordshire from 2004 to 2009, which included 11 Minor Counties Championship matches and 11 MCCA Knockout Trophy matches.  He made his only List A appearance against Sussex in the 2005 Cheltenham & Gloucester Trophy.  In this match, he scored 27 runs before being dismissed by James Kirtley.

He has also played Second XI cricket for the Essex, Kent, Nottinghamshire, Worcestershire and Leicestershire Second XI's.

References

External links

1982 births
Living people
People from Hornchurch
English cricketers
Bedfordshire cricketers